The castra of Poiana was a fort in the Roman province of Dacia. It was erected in the 2nd century AD and abandoned in the next century.

See also
List of castra

Notes

External links
Roman castra from Romania - Google Maps / Earth

Roman legionary fortresses in Romania
History of Muntenia
Historic monuments in Teleorman County